Shahryar Dastan (born March 18, 1976 in Tehran) is an Iranian footballer.

Career

Iran
Dastan played extensively in the Iranian football league system, for Saipa, Esteghlal Tehran, Paykan, Teraktor Sazi Tabriz, Nadial Yarmouk, Homa and Shahrdari Mahshahr. He was part of the Saipa team which won back-to-back Azadegan League championships in 1994 and 1995, and competed in the 1995–96 Asian Club Championship, in which Saipa finished in fourth place.

United States
Dastan came to the United States in 2010, and played for the Hollywood United Hitmen in the USL Premier Development League. After spending a brief period playing professional indoor soccer with the Missouri Comets in the Major Indoor Soccer League, Dastan signed with the expansion Los Angeles Blues of the new USL Professional League in February 2011. After completing his playing career, he have as become a youth coach.

International
Dastan was part of the Iranian Youth National Team from 1991 to 1993, and played for the Iranian national futsal team at the 2001 Tiger Cup futsal championship in Singapore.

References

External links
 Official site

1976 births
Living people
Iranian footballers
Iranian expatriate footballers
Saipa F.C. players
Esteghlal F.C. players
Paykan F.C. players
Tractor S.C. players
Homa F.C. players
Hollywood United Hitmen players
Orange County SC players
Expatriate soccer players in the United States
USL League Two players
USL Championship players
Association football midfielders
Missouri Comets players